L'Est Films Group Int’l Co (EFG) is an entertainment industry company involved in movie distribution and production.

History 
The company was founded by Chen Zhi-heng in 2008, who was selected as the Chinese cinema programmer of the Venice Film Festival in 2009. Before the company was officially registered, Chen had already distributed several movies in France under the name of L'est Films Group. The main activity of EFG includes movie production and distribution. Many well-known directors such as Wen Hai, Wan Ma-Cai-Dan and Zou Peng share partnerships with EFG. The movie Court House on the Horseback, directed by Liu Jie, which won the Best Feature Film Award in the Horizon Section of the 63rd Venice International Film Festival, was distributed by Chen in 2006.

 In March 2010, EFG co-produced the French movie China Shalom with the French director Emmanuel Sapolsky.
 In February 2010, EFG co-operated with the French media company Le Don Films to make a movie styled series, officially entering into the TV market.
 In August 2009, a new branch in Malaysia was opened to explore the market in Southeast Asia.
 From December 2009, EFG not only distributes Chinese movies abroad, but movies in India, U.S.A., Japan and France as well.
 In 2009, the movie Reconstructing Faith by Wen Hai was co-produced with the French company Films d'ici.
 In early 2009, EFG moved into both movie production and distribution fields.
 In August 2008, the first work of EFG, Wo men (We), received a special mention in the "Horizons - 'Premio orrizonti'" section at the 65th Venice International Film Festival.
 In 2008, Chen founded L'Est Films Group in Hong Kong.

Awards
 2004: The Grassland, 3rd International Student Film & Video Festival of Beijing Film Academy, Award for Best Short Film of Chinese students
 2005: MAMA, 4th International Student Film & Video Festival of Beijing Film Academy, Best Asian Student Work
 2005: The Silent Holy Stone, 24th Vancouver International Film Festival, Dragons & Tigers Award Jury Special Mentions
 2005: Floating Dust, 16th Festival international du documentaire de Marseille, Georges de Beauregard Prize
 2006: Court House on the Horseback, 63rd Venice International Film Festival, Best Feature Film Award
 2006: The Silent Holy Stone, 9th Shanghai International Film Festival Asian new unit, Best Director Award
 2006: MAMA, 11th Tel Aviv International Student Film Festival, Special Mention
 2006: MAMA, 2006 Busan Asian Short Film Festival, Apple Korea Award
 2006: Dream Walking, 28th Cinéma du Réel documentary film festival Jury Prize
 2008: Duck & Goose, 5th Japan Con-Can Movie Festival, Special Mention Award
 2008: We, 65th Venice Film Festival Venice, Special Mention
 2009: The Search, Bangkok International Film Festival 2009, Golden Kinnaree Awards The Special July Prize
 2009: No Country for Chicken, 62nd Locarno International Film Festival, Film and Video Subtitling Prize
 2009: Red River, 3rd Chungmuro International Film Festival in Seoul, Best Film Award
 2009: Cucumber, Cinema Digital Seoul 2009 Film Festival, Movie Collage Award
 2009: The Search, 12th Shanghai International Film Festival, Jury Prize
 2009: Painted Skin, 28th Hong Kong Film Awards, Best Cinematography & Best Original Film Song
 2009: A North Chinese Girl, 33rd Hong Kong International Film Festival, FIPRESCI Award
 2010: The High Life, 34th Hong Kong International Film Festival, the Silver Digital Award and the |FIPRESCI Award

Distribution 
2001
 Miss Jinxing by Zhang Yuan
 Beijing Suburb by Hu Ze
2002
 I Love You by Zhang Yuan
 Jiang Jie by Zhang Yuan
2003
 Green Tea by Zhang Yuan
 Floating Dust by Wen Hai
 In The Military Training Camp by Wen Hai
2004
 The Grassland by Wan Ma-Cai-Can/Pema Tseden
2005
 200420 by Wang Ao-fei
 MAMA by Li Jia
2007
 Glass Eye by Xu Yi-liang
 The Silent Holy Stone by Wan Ma-Cai-Dan/Pema Tseden
 Magellan by Li Jun-hua, Hyojeong Kim, Dubianhongwen
 Duck & Goose by Bai Zhi-xun
 Sunshine on her Shoulders by Zeng Xiao-xiao
 Flower Seeds by Wei A-ting
 73006 by Wang Ao-fei
 Court House on the Horseback by Liu Jie
 Brave Heart by Ye Kai
2008
 Cucumber by Zhou Yao-wu
 Red River by Zhang Jia-rui
 Innocent as I was by Xiao Xiao
 Secret Tunnel by Xi Xue-qing
 Dream Walking by Wen Hai
 We by Wen Hai
 The Search Wan Ma-Cai-Dan/Pema Tseden
 Karma by Wang Ming
 Monologue by Wang Ao-fei
 Yonder Land by Tian Li
 Twilight Dancing by Shu Ya
 Get on the Way by Jin Li-peng
 No country for chicken by Huang Zhen
 A piece of sound advice by Gilles Charmant
 Painted Skin by Chen Jia-shang
2009
 Legend of the Tang Empire by Jin Tie-mu
 The Story of 3 Ports by Li Jun-hua, Hyojeong Kim, Dubianhongwen
2010
 Take Out by Sean Baker, Shih-Ching Tsou
 Monologue by Wang Ao-fei
 200420 by Wang Ao-fei
 73006 by Wang Ao-fei
 A Piece of Sound Advice by Gilles Charmant
2011
 Repair by WANG Zi-zhao
 Ancient Capital by Li Ji
 Born in Beijing by Zhang Tian-hui

Production 
2003
 Die Other Where by Chen Zhi-heng
 Genica by Chen Zhi-heng
2004
 The Belgian Chocolate by Chen Zhi-heng
2009
 A North Chinese Girl by Zou Peng
 By the River by Yan Wen-xin
 Crust by Wen Hai
2010
 The High Life by Zhao Da-yong
 Linin by Wen Hai
 Reconstructing Faith by Wen Hai
2011
 A Cruelties of Youth by Mao Mao
 Empty Nest by Yan Wen-xin
 Rain or Shine by Ariane Doublet, Wen Hai

Programmed film festival 
 Doclisboa 2008 - Made in China, 16–26 October 2008
 Barcelona, Chinese City: Does Beijing still exist?, 14–31 January 2009
 14ème Édition des Rencontres du Cinéma Documentaire, 6–13 June 2009

External links
 https://web.archive.org/web/20121011205535/http://blog.sina.com.cn/s/blog_5247f2b90100bcyf.html July 2008
 Persional interview with Chen Zhi-peng, 12 February 2009
 Movie Salon first edition, 3 December 2008
 Haishangyanyun, 22 January 2010
 The High Life—Film Review

Film production companies of China
Mass media companies established in 2008
Chinese companies established in 2008
Companies based in Beijing